The Rolling Stones' 1967 European Tour was a concert tour by the band to promote their new album Between the Buttons and new singles "Let's Spend the Night Together" and "Ruby Tuesday".

History 
The tour commenced on 25 March and concluded on 17 April 1967. It was the last Rolling Stones concert tour to include Brian Jones, who initially formed and named the band.

This tour would also be one of the first times a rock band from Western Europe performed in Eastern Europe, when on 13 April, they played two shows at the Palace of Culture and Science in Warsaw, Poland. The people who did attend were told to behave accordingly during the concert or they would be removed from the venue, however, a riot started. Visiting Soviet officials were not pleased by the Rolling Stones performance and it would be a long while before the Stones would return to the Eastern Bloc nations.

"They thought the show was so awful, so decadent, that they said this would never happen in Moscow,"—Mick Jagger.

The Rolling Stones
Mick Jagger – lead vocals
Keith Richards – guitar, backing vocals
Brian Jones – guitar, harmonica, electric dulcimer, recorder, organ
Bill Wyman – bass guitar, backing vocals
Charlie Watts – drums

Tour set list
"The Last Time"
"Paint It, Black"
"19th Nervous Breakdown"
"Lady Jane"
"Get Off of My Cloud"/"Yesterday's Papers"
"Under My Thumb"
"Ruby Tuesday"
"Let's Spend the Night Together"
"Goin' Home"
"(I Can't Get No) Satisfaction"

Tour dates

Supporting acts
Including: the Easybeats, the Creation, the Batman (Didi & the ABC Boys), & Achim Reichel (Ex-Rattles), the Move, Czerwono-Czarni (Warsaw), Stormy Six (Italy).

References
 Carr, Roy.  The Rolling Stones: An Illustrated Record.  Harmony Books, 1976.  
 Wyman, Bill and Havers, Richard.  Rolling with the Stones. DK Publishing, 2002.  

The Rolling Stones concert tours
1967 concert tours
1967 in Europe
Concert tours of Europe